William Ruthven, 2nd Lord Ruthven (died December 1552) was a Scottish nobleman. He served as an Extraordinary Lord of Session and Keeper of the Privy Seal.

Life

The 2nd Lord Ruthven was the son of William, Master of Ruthven (who was known as Lindsay for his mother, Isabel Livingstone Lindsay, until his legitimation on 2 July 1480), and Jean Hepburne.  He succeeded his paternal grandfather, William Ruthven, 1st Lord Ruthven, sometime before 10 September 1528, when the king bestowed on him the office of custodian and constable of the king's hospital, near the Speygate, Perth.

In February 1532 Ruthven, Lord Oliphant, and other barons in that district of Scotland were fined for not appearing to sit as jurymen at the trial of Lady Glamis at Forfar for poisoning her husband. He was admitted an extraordinary lord of session on 27 November 1533; and on 8 August 1542 he was named a member of the privy council. On 28 August 1536 the king confirmed to him and his heirs the lands of Glenshie in Strathearn, erected into a free forest.

At the parliament held at Edinburgh in March 1543, after the death of King James V, Ruthven spoke on behalf of the laity being granted liberty to read the Scriptures in the English tongue; and at the same parliament he was chosen one of the eight noblemen, two of whom were to have the charge of the young queen every three months. On 24 July 1543 he signed a band to support Cardinal Beaton, but his adherence to the cardinal was only temporary, for in 1544 he resisted by force of arms the cardinal's candidate for the provostship of Perth.

Ruthven was appointed keeper of the privy seal in July 1546 . On 24 August of the same year he appeared before the privy council with Patrick Hepburn, 3rd Earl of Bothwell, as caution that Bothwell's ship, the Mary, and other four barks should not take any ships belonging to the Dutch, Flemings, or Hungarians. On 13 September he obtained an heritable grant of the king's house of Perth, of which he was keeper. He died early in December 1552.

Family

In 1515 he married Janet Haliburton, heiress of the Haliburtons of Dirleton Castle, and sister of Mariotta Haliburton, Countess of Home.

Their eldest son, Patrick, inherited the Lordship on his father's death. They had three sons and seven daughters;
 Patrick Ruthven, 3rd Lord Ruthven
 James Ruthven of Forteviot
 Alexander Ruthven of Freeland
 Lilias Ruthven, married to David Drummond, 2nd Lord Drummond (she was reputed for her piety, and to her Robert Alexander in 1539 dedicated the Testament of William Hay, 6th Earl of Erroll, which he set forth in Scottish metre, printed Edinburgh 1571). Their daughter, Anne Drummond, was the first wife of John Erskine, Earl of Mar;
 Catherine Ruthven, who married Sir Colin Campbell of Glenorchy in 1551
 Cecilia Ruthven, who married Sir David Wemyss of that ilk, and was the mother of Sir John Wemyss
 Barbara Ruthven, to Patrick Gray, 5th Lord Gray
 Janet Ruthven, married John Crichton of Strathaird
 Margaret Ruthven, to John Johnstone of Elphinstone
 Christina Ruthven, to William Lundin of that ilk

References

Attribution

Year of birth unknown
1552 deaths
16th-century Scottish people
Court of James V of Scotland
Ruthven
Lords of Parliament (pre-1707)
William